Ross Rhoads (June 20, 1932 – May 24, 2017) was an American megachurch pastor who served at Charlotte's Calvary Church based in Charlotte, North Carolina from 1973 to 1995.

Rhoads died on May 24, 2017. He is survived by his wife and three children.

References

1932 births
2017 deaths
People from Charlotte, North Carolina
American clergy